Four general speed limits apply on roads in Bosnia and Herzegovina:

  within inhabited places
  outside inhabited places
  on expressways (cesta za motorna vozila)
  on motorways (autoput or autocesta)

The limits shown above apply only if there are no other signs present, as the signs may prescribe a lower or a higher speed limit (limits of 80 km/h or higher can also be found within inhabited places).

References

Bosnia and Herzegovina
Transport in Bosnia and Herzegovina